Niyalish Para railway station is a halt railway station on the Howrah–Azimganj line of Howrah railway division of Eastern Railway zone. It is located at Belun, Niyalish Para of Murshidabad district in the Indian state of West Bengal.

History
In 1913, the Hooghly–Katwa Railway constructed a  broad gauge line from Bandel to Katwa, and the Barharwa–Azimganj–Katwa Railway constructed the  broad gauge Barharwa–Azimganj–Katwa loop. With the construction of the Farakka Barrage and opening of the railway bridge in 1971, the railway communication picture of this line were completely changed. Total 13 local trains stop at Niyalish Para railway station. The rail distance between Niyalish Para and Howrah is approximately 216 km.

References

Railway stations in Murshidabad district
Howrah railway division